u-blox is a Swiss company that creates wireless semiconductors and modules for consumer, automotive and industrial markets. They operate as a fabless IC and design house.

They acquired a dozen companies after their IPO in 2007, after acquiring connectblue in 2014 and Lesswire in 2015  they acquired Rigado's module business in 2019. In 2020, u-blox acquired Thingstream

u-blox was founded in 1997 and is headquartered in Thalwil, Switzerland. The company is listed at the Swiss Stock Exchange (SIX:UBXN) and has offices in the USA, Singapore, China, Taiwan, Korea, Japan, India, Pakistan, Australia, Ireland, the UK, Belgium, Germany, Sweden, Finland, Italy and Greece.

u-blox develops and sells chips and modules that support global navigation satellite systems (GNSS), including receivers for GPS, GLONASS, Galileo, BeiDou and QZSS. The wireless range consists of GSM-, UMTS- and CDMA2000 and LTE modules, as well as Bluetooth- and WiFi-modules. All these products enable the delivery of complete systems for location-based services and M2M applications (machine-to-machine communication) in the Internet of Things, that rely on the convergence of 2G/3G/4G, Bluetooth-, Wi-Fi technology and satellite navigation.

u-blox provides starter kits which allow quick prototyping of variety of applications for the Internet of Things.

References

External links

Bloomberg Business
Yahoo! UBXN stock quote
New possibilities with internet of things
Multi Radio Solution
Improving 3D automotive navigation accuracy
M2M alliance

Companies established in 1997
Companies listed on the SIX Swiss Exchange
Semiconductor companies of Switzerland
Swiss brands
Navigational equipment
Radio navigation
Wireless locating
Companies based in the canton of Zürich
Thalwil